Seh Lor (also known as Seh Lozh) is a village in Sadat Rural District, in the Central District of Lali County, Khuzestan Province, Iran. At the 2006 census, its population was 310, in 55 families.

References 

Populated places in Lali County